Building Tomorrow (BT) is an international social-profit organization with school-building operations in Sub-Saharan Africa.

History

When George Srour, the founder and executive director of Building Tomorrow, first visited Uganda as a United Nations intern, he was struck by the lack of education infrastructure and how over-crowded and inefficient the existing schools were. Upon returning to the College of William & Mary, he decided to do all that he could to help the children he met overseas.

In December 2004, George started those efforts at College of William & Mary. Through a campaign that he initiated, called Christmas in Kampala, students at the school raised almost $45,000 to fund the construction of a primary academy in Kampala, Uganda. In May 2006, the school, now known as Meeting Point Kampala, was completed and opened to students.

After this campaign, Srour was awarded the inaugural Simon Fellowship for Noble Purpose. He has said that this is what allowed him to make building schools for children in sub-Saharan Africa a full-time job. Srour created the non-profit organization Building Tomorrow as a continuation of Christmas in Kampala.

Schools

There are currently twenty-seven Building Tomorrow Academies in operation in Uganda and eleven are under construction.

The BT Academy of Lutisi, the second academy and the first to be opened under the Building Tomorrow name, was supported by Key Club International and opened in May 2008.
The BT Academy of Buwasa was supported by Global Playground and was opened in July 2008.
The BT Academy of Kiyamba was supported by a group of Butler University students associated with Ambassadors for Children. It was opened in June 2009.
The Award Winning BT Academy of Gita was supported by the University of Virginia and opened on August 6, 2010. The Academy was also designed by University of Virginia engineering and architecture students through Architecture Studio reCOVER and the Engineering in Context Capstone Design Program. The Academy is the recipient of the 2010 American Institute of Architects Education Honor Award the 2011 Association of Collegiate Schools of Architecture Collaborative Practice Award.
The BT Academy of Sentigi was supported by the University of Notre Dame and opened in October 2010.
The BT Academy of Jomba was supported by the city of Indianapolis and University of Wisconsin-River Falls and was opened in January 2011
The BT Academy of Bubeezi was supported by the Engage Network and opened in January 2012.
The NA Barakat Academy of Nakaseeta was supported by the Barakat Family and opened in July 2012. Designs for this Academy were solicited in partnership with Architecture for Humanity through the 2009 Open Architecture Challenge: Classroom.  A team of engineers at Gifford, a structural engineering firm based in the United Kingdom, produced the winning design.
The BT Academy of Kyeitabya was supported by the University of Notre Dame School of Architecture through the generosity of Matthew and Joyce Walsh and opened in August 2012. The Academy was also designed by students in the University of Notre Dame School of Architecture.
The BT Academy of Kidula was supported by the University of North Carolina at Chapel Hill and opened in May 2013.
The BT Academy of Kibimba was supported by student at Indiana University Bloomington.
The BT Academy of Lukindu is supported by the Segal Family Foundation
The BT Academy of Bugabo is supported by the Davidson College and Virginia Tech chapters.
The BT Academy of Kabasegwa is supported by the Kappa Kappa Gamma.org/betaxi/pages/philanthropy/building-tomorrow.php Kappa Kappa Gamma chapter  at the University of Texas-Austin.
The BT Academy of Mabaale is supported by One Day's Wages. This is the first academy built in Uganda's Kalungu district.
The BT Academy of Mayira is supported by the University of Virginia's Studio reCOVER Initiative.

Clinton Global Initiative
In September 2011 Building Tomorrow announced at the Clinton Global Initiative Annual Meeting in New York City a commitment to build 60 Academies over 5 years, through the year 2016. In addition, at the meeting BT launched an initiative aimed at improving the quality of education in Ugandan communities by training over 450 current and future educators and developing a rural-relevant classroom curriculum.

In July 2012 President Clinton and daughter Chelsea traveled to the Building Tomorrow Academy of Gita, where they visited with teachers and students and watched dances by the student choir, along with meeting the hundreds of community members that gathered at the academy.

At the CGI Annual Meeting in 2012 President Clinton announced a $500,000 gift to assist in Building Tomorrow's 2011 commitment. This was the largest single contribution that the organization had ever received.

Model

Building Tomorrow works in Sub-Saharan Africa—currently building in Uganda—identifying areas that have the greatest number of children with the least access to primary school. In the beginning, the organization contacted communities that they felt had the greatest need, based on government statistics. But in recent years, Building Tomorrow's reputation throughout Uganda has grown such that more and more communities are approaching the organization to request that a school be built in their area. In these places, Building Tomorrow works to build a partnership with the community so that they can build a school together. Committees of residents and local leaders are established to oversee the construction process from start to finish.

Building Tomorrow chapters and supporters provide what they call challenge grants to communities equal to the cost of construction materials for a new academy. This means that in exchange for building materials and support, local community members and family & friends of future Building Tomorrow students commit to volunteer over 20,000 hours of their time to construct each academy. For the more recent schools, community members have also been asked to donate the land on which the school is built.

When the construction of the academy is completed, the building is leased to the local government to manage day-to-day operations under an agreement with Building Tomorrow. As a result of the Universal Primary Education Initiative and a Memorandum of Understanding with Building Tomorrow, the Ugandan Ministry of Education has agreed to fund teachers’ salaries and other long-term operating costs for each academy. So far, they have honored that commitment and every Building Tomorrow school is fully staffed.

Each BT academy is self-sustained and equipped with seven classrooms (P1 through P7—or the US equivalent of 1st through 7th grade), an office, a library, meeting space, toilets, a field, and has classroom space for 325 students.

Fundraising network

Building Tomorrow has student-led chapters at over 25 colleges and universities internationally, has a partnership with Key Club International, the world’s largest high school service organization, and has a growing network of young professionals through the organization’s Social Investment Council.

Building Tomorrow's most well-known and most successful on-campus fundraising event is Bike to Uganda. It is a student conceived and executed event, pitting man vs. distance. No matter the campus, the ultimate goal for the event is the same – to bike the distance to Kampala, Uganda while raising the funds necessary to build a Building Tomorrow primary-level academy for 325 kids in Uganda.

Each participating campus sets out stationary bikes in a high-traffic location on campus for up to five days. Throughout the event (and many times, in the weeks leading up to it) chapters host competitions (most money raised, most miles biked, most participants from a particular group or class, etc.). Chapters also schedule a wide variety of entertainment including performances by a capella and dance groups and celebrity appearances by well-known professors, deans, athletes and mascots.

Another noteworthy supporter is Archbishop Desmond Tutu, who serves as Honorary Chairman of Building Tomorrow’s board of directors. He has spoken frequently on their behalf and stated that "I believe that education is the key to unlocking the door to eradicate poverty and that young people have the power to make it happen."

The organization also accepts donations online, and has recently made efforts to increase awareness through social media and online advertising. One campaign that they unveiled on January 25, 2011 is an online education-cost calculator. Using data compiled by the National Center for Education Statistics, this tool allows Americans born prior to 1999 to calculate the approximate cost of their 1-7th grade education. The calculator then generates the approximate number of children who could be put through primary school for the same cost.

Current

Today, BT has opened 27 primary-level academies in Uganda. Each academy is fully staffed; with expenses and salaries being covered by the Ugandan Ministry of Education. Nearly 90% of students at the BT Academy of Lutisi who sat for their Primary Leaving Examinations (PLE) in 2010 passed. 10 of these students went on to secondary school with the help of their communities and donors supporting Building Tomorrow's initiative.

Awards
Building Tomorrow was named one of the top 20 up-and-coming social change organizations in the world in 2007 by Echoing Green.
The organization was also recognized by the Waldzell Institute of Austria.
The BT Academy of Gita is the recipient of the 2010 American Institute of Architects Education Honor Award and the 2011 Association of Collegiate Schools of Architecture Collaborative Practice Award.
Building Tomorrow founder George Srour was named to the 2012 Forbes 30 Under 30 list for Social Entrepreneurs.

References 

 

Development charities based in the United States
Charities based in Indiana
Foreign charities operating in Uganda